Gordy was one of 29 s (officially known as Project 7) built for the Soviet Navy during the late 1930s. Completed in 1938, she was assigned to the Baltic Fleet. The ship was covering a minelaying operation after the start of the German invasion of the Soviet Union (Operation Barbarossa) in June 1941 when she entered a German minefield. One of her sister ships had her bow blown off and Gordy rescued the survivors. The ship provided naval gunfire support for Soviet ground forces over the next several months, although she was badly damaged by a mine during the evacuation of Tallinn, Estonia, in August. After repairs, Gordy was assigned to evacuate Soviet troops from their enclave in Hanko, Finland, in November, but struck several mines en route and sank with heavy loss of life.

Design and description
Having decided to build the large and expensive   destroyer leaders, the Soviet Navy sought Italian assistance in designing smaller and cheaper destroyers.

Their crew numbered 197 officers and sailors in peacetime and 236 in wartime. The designers had been conservative in rating the turbines and many, but not all, of the ships handily exceeded their designed speed during their sea trials. Others fell considerably short of it, although specific figures for most individual ships have not survived.

As built, the Gnevny-class ships mounted four  B-13 guns in two pairs of superfiring single mounts fore and aft of the superstructure. Anti-aircraft defense was provided by a pair of  34-K AA guns in single mounts and a pair of  21-K AA guns as well as two  DK or DShK machine guns. They carried six  torpedo tubes in two rotating triple mounts; each tube was provided with a reload. The ships could also carry a maximum of either 60 or 95 mines and 25 depth charges. The ships were equipped with two K-1 paravanes intended to destroy mines and a pair of depth-charge throwers.

Construction and service 
Built in Leningrad's Shipyard No. 190 (Zhdanov) as yard number 514, Gordy was laid down on 25 June 1936 and launched on 10 June 1937. Completed on 23 December 1938, the ship was assigned to the Baltic Fleet. She served on patrol and escort duty during the Winter War. Gordy took off Gnevnys crew after submarine periscopes were reported spotted and unsuccessfully attempted to sink her with gunfire. Later that day, she was lightly damaged when her paravanes triggered the explosion of two mines. The destroyer subsequently fought in the defense of Moonsund and Tallinn, Estonia, as German ground forces advanced northward, as well as laying mines herself.

She participated in an unsuccessful attack on a group of German landing craft off the mouth of the Daugava River on 13 July. While covering the evacuation of Tallinn on 28 August as part of the detachment of main forces led by Kirov, a mine exploded in one of the ship's paravanes. Her captain ordered 45 specialists to remain aboard ship and had the rest of the crew taken aboard the minesweeper Gak. She was towed to Kronstadt by the destroyer , a process that took two days as it was necessary to anchor at night. The two destroyers were subjected to constant German air attacks, and Gordy expended all of her anti-aircraft ammunition but escaped unscathed.

At Kronstadt she was placed in a dry dock for repairs. Gordy received splinter damage during an air raid on Kronstadt on 21 September. Nine days later, the ship was transferred to Leningrad's Baltic Shipyard to finish her repairs, which were completed on 8 October. She was positioned off Ust-Izhora on 14 October to provide naval gunfire support for Soviet troops. Gordy bombarded German positions in support of a local counter-attack near Sinyavino between 20 and 25 October. During 1941 the ship fired a total of 349 shells from her 130 mm guns.

On 13 November she departed Gogland Island for Hanko as part of the fourth convoy to evacuate Soviet troops alongside the destroyer  and the minelayer . The ships ran into a minefield and Surovy was blown up, after which Gordy took the lead position in the convoy. The following morning a mine detonated in one of her paravanes without damage. Ten minutes later another struck the hull at 03:30 between the aft boiler room and the forward engine room and knocked out her power, killing all personnel in both rooms. The ship listed at 30° which decreased to 10° with counter-flooding. Although the ship remained afloat due to her bulkheads, Yefet decided to abandon ship. The other ships in the convoy rescued 76 survivors and an additional dozen were able to sail to Gogland in one of her boats; among those lost was Yefet, her only wartime captain. She was officially struck from the Navy List on 19 November.

Citations

Sources

Further reading
 

Gnevny-class destroyers
1937 ships
Ships built at Severnaya Verf
Ships sunk by mines